This is a list of MPs elected to the House of Commons at the 1852 United Kingdom general election, arranged by constituency. New MPs elected since the general election and changes in party allegiance are noted at the bottom of the page.



Changes

1852 
1852: Following the general election 48 MPs, elected as Liberals in Ireland, formed the Independent Irish Party. They included William Keogh (Athlone), John Sadleir (Carlow), John Ball (County Carlow), Sir Timothy O'Brien, Bt (Cashel), Cornelius O'Brien (Clare) unseated on petition, Hon. Cecil Lawless (Clonmel), Francis Murphy (Cork), William Trant Fagan (Cork), James McCann (Drogheda), George Bowyer (Dundalk), Jogn Maguire (Dungarvan), John Fitzgerald (Ennis), Anthony O'Flaherty (Galway), Martin Blake (Galway), Sir Thomas Burke, Bt (County Galway), Thomas Bellew (County Galway).

1853 
1 January 1853: John Sadleir (Independent Irish Party-Carlow) accepted office in the Aberdeen coalition and was defeated seeking re-election as a Liberal on 20 January 1853.
April 1853: William Keogh (Independent Irish Party-Athlone) accepted office in the Aberdeen coalition and was re-elected as a Liberal on 23 April 1853.

Incomplete

Notes

References
 British Electoral Facts 1832–1999, compiled and edited by Colin Rallings and Michael Thrasher (Ashgate Publishing Ltd 2000)
 Spartacus: Political Parties and Election Results

See also
List of parliaments of the United Kingdom
UK general election, 1852

1852
1852 United Kingdom general election
 List
UK MPs